The Pipe Band Club is a competitive pipe band located in Sydney, Australia. The band was formed in 2008 and attended The World Pipe Band Championships in 2009 and 2010, competing in Grade 1. The band was led by Scott Nicolson until 2010 at which point Angus Roberts was elected Pipe Major. The band was the winner of the Australian Championship (Grade 1) in 2010, and has also consistently held the New South Wales state title since inauguration.  In 2012 the band requested to be relegated to Grade 2 and this was approved by the Australian Pipe Band Association (now called Pipe Bands Australia). The band won the 2014 Australian Championship in Grade 2, and went on to host the NSW Championships in November 2014, marking the first time the band had acted as a contest promoter.

Still in Grade 2 in 2015, the band secured a win in the Queensland State Championships, then traveled to Scotland for a two-week tour ending with the World Championships in August 2015. The band took 2nd place in Grade 2 at North Berwick and 3rd place in Grade 2 at Perth. A week later, at the World Championships, the band took 2nd place in their heat before progressing and placing 9th in the final.

In 2016, The Pipe Band Club once again retained their NSW Championship title and shortly after, the Australian Championship title (Grade 2) in a field of five competitors, with Moorabbin City taking 2nd and Hawthorne City placing 3rd.

The Pipeband Club returned to Scotland in 2017, competing at North Berwick Highland Games and Bridge of Allan Highland Games in preparation for the World Pipe Band Championships in Glasgow. The band secured 4th place in Grade 2 at North Berwick in a field of 14 bands, and at Bridge of Allan, securing 5th in Grade 2 (14 competitors in the field) and a 1st place in Grade 1 (in a field of 8 competitors), an unexpected result for a band playing in a higher division than their official grading. At the 2017 World Pipe Band Championships, the band placed 2nd in their qualifying heat, thus earning one of twelve spots in the Grade 2 final. On this occasion, the band improved on their 2015 result by placing 8th in the final.

References

Pipe bands
Grade 2 pipe bands